In convex analysis, a branch of mathematics, the effective domain extends of the domain of a function defined for functions that take values in the extended real number line  

In convex analysis and variational analysis, a point at which some given extended real-valued function is minimized is typically sought, where such a point is called a global minimum point. The effective domain of this function is defined to be the set of all points in this function's domain at which its value is not equal to  It is defined this way because it is only these points that have even a remote chance of being a global minimum point.

If the problem is instead a maximization problem (which would be clearly indicated) then the effective domain instead consists of all points in the function's domain at which it is not equal to

Definition

In convex analysis and variational analysis,  is usually assumed to be  unless clearly indicated otherwise.

Characterizations

Let  denote the canonical projection onto  which is defined by  
 

Properties

If a function  takes the value  such as if the function is real-valued, then its domain and effective domain are equal.  

See also

References

  

Convex analysis
Functions and mappings